Tagak may refer to:
Tagak Curley, Inuit leader, politician and businessman from Nunavut
I.S.T. XL-15 Tagak, an aircraft
Tagak, Iran